Yulia Mykytenko (born 18 July 1995 in Kyiv, Ukraine) is a military servicewoman of the Armed Forces of Ukraine, combatant of the Russo-Ukrainian War, recipient of the Order for Courage (3rd class), activist of the сivic movement "Vidsich" and of the NGO "Female veterans movement".

Biography

Early years 
She was born on 18 July 1995 in Kyiv. Her parents have met while working at a currency exchange point: her mother was a cashier and her father was a security guard. As a child, Julia dreamed of becoming a simultaneous translator. In 2012, she entered the National University of Kyiv-Mohyla Academy, which she graduated in 2016 with a degree in philology.

During the Euromaidan she was in the "Female Squad" of the 16th regiment of the Euromaidan Self-defence Force. Together with other Kyiv-Mohyla Academy students she was participating in demonstrations taking part near numerous universities all over Kyiv, calling on students to join the protests. Right after Euromaidan she took part in the activities of the сivic movement "Vidsich" (particularly, in the campaign "Do not buy Russian goods!"). She also did some open-source intelligence for the Ukrainian military: she searched and collected information about Russian military in Twitter. Meanwhile, her father volunteered for the National Guard of Ukraine in February 2014.

54th Mechanized Brigade 
In March 2015 she met with military serviceman Ilia Serbin of the 54th Mechanized Brigade, when her father (with whom she was living at the moment) was asked to let Serbin stay overnight at his home. Three month later they have married. The couple decided to join the 54th Mechanized Brigade together, right after Mykytenko graduated from the university. At that time, the brigade was fighting near Svitlodar, one of the heaviest warfares of the Ukrainian frontline. They did exactly that on 17 July 2016 (beforehand, Ilia had already served in the brigade as a mobilized person).

After two months of service at the headquarters, Ilia was assigned to a combat position - a scout. Yulia was appointed to a clerk position at the headquarters, since at that time women were not allowed to hold combat positions. Yulia worked as a clerk and then as an accountant for about a year. In the spring of 2017, as a person with a higher education, she was sent to a three-month officer course at the Hetman Petro Sahaidachnyi National Ground Forces Academy in Lviv. Upon her return, she was appointed to a position of commander of a motorized infantry platoon, and later a commander of a reconnaissance platoon (her experience in data collection and analytics contributed to this). However, according to Yulia, she encountered a lot of sexism and skepticism about that "a woman can fight". It even got to the point that some soldiers refused to fight under the command of a woman and were transferred to other units. She had to make considerable efforts to gain respect and obedience from her subordinates.

Ivan Bohun Military High School 
On 22 February 2018 her husband died as a result of mortar shelling near the town of Luhanske. Yulia decided to transfer to a teacher position at the Ivan Bohun Military High School. The very same year, girls were allowed to enter the school for the very first time, and Yulia was appointed a commander of a very first female platoon of twenty girls. According to Yulia, she took this job very seriously, because the success of this experimental female class was crucial for whether the girls would continue to be accepted to the school and for how successful the reforms will be to increase the number and improve conditions for women in the Armed Forces of Ukraine. In addition to the usual duties of a class curator, Yulia also had to deal with the everyday problems of her subordinates, since the school, like the Armed Forces of Ukraine in general, was not completely adapted for the education and accommodation of girls.

At night of 11 October 2020 her father, Mykola Mykytenko, also a veteran of the Donbas War, set himself on fire at the Independence Square in Kyiv to show his protest against the policies of Volodymyr Zelenskyy administration, which he considered to be leading the country into capitulation. Three days later, on 14 October, he died of his burns. Thus, because of the war, she lost both her husband and her father.

Russian full-scale invasion 
On 2 September 2021 she left the Armed Forces of Ukraine, planning to build her career somewhere in the civilian sphere. After leaving the army, she worked as a project manager in the human rights public project "Invisible Battalion" and in several other projects for the reintegration of war veterans into society, for example in the "Veteranius" initiative.

She was mobilized back to the Armed Forces of Ukraine on 24 February 2022, when the Russian full-scale invasion into Ukraine began. For the first few months, she served in a unit located in Kyiv, and after the liberation of the north of Ukraine, she returned to the 54th Mechanized Brigade (where she served back then, during the Donbas War), which was fighting in the Donetsk Oblast. On 14 October 2022 she was awarded the Order for Courage (3rd class) by decree of the President of Ukraine.

Gallery

See also 
 Invisible Battalion
 54th Mechanized Brigade (Ukraine)
 Ivan Bohun Military High School
 Women in the military
 Vidsich

Links

References 

Ukrainian military personnel of the war in Donbas
Ukrainian military personnel of the 2022 Russian invasion of Ukraine
Ukrainian female military personnel
People of the Euromaidan
Vidsich
Recipients of the Order For Courage, 3rd class
1995 births
Living people